La Floresta is an electoral parish or district of Quito, the capital city of Ecuador.  The parish was established as a result of the October 2006 political elections when the city was divided into 19 urban electoral parishes.

References

Parishes of Quito Canton
Populated places in Pichincha Province